The Panasonic Lumix DMC-G85/G80 (DMC-G81 in Germany) is a mid-level DSLR-styled Micro Four-Thirds mirrorless camera announced on September 19, 2016. It is the follow-up to the Panasonic Lumix DMC-G7. Its main improvements are a weather-sealed body, an upgraded EVF, no recording limit and the addition of 5-axis in-body image stabilization which works together with lens stabilization and a Post Focus function. Like the G7, movies can be recorded in 4K resolution at 100 mbs. The G85/G80 body weighs 90g more than its predecessor.

Specifications 
Magnesium alloy front panel
Focus-bracketing
Post Focus image (developed by 4K movie)
Combined Image stabilization (5-axis image stabilization, Dual I.S. with Panasonic lens: in-camera 5-axis image stabilization works in tandem with in-lens LUMIX I.S.)
Wi-Fi connectivity (Android, Apple); all functions and shooting can be operated by smartphone

Post Focus image 
One of new specifications is Post Focus image. It works similar as focus bracketing; in this case 4K movie make 8 MPx size photography, where all 49 focal points make focus stacked image, which can be joined Automatic on camera or user can choose which part of scenes will be stacked together into one image. It can be used handsfree, but for better images (i.e. no mistakes at stacking) the use of tripod is recommended.

Focus Bracketing 
For stacked images in full size user can set Focus Bracketing. User choose how many shots will be taken at what kind of step (between 1–5). Step 1 has smaller distance to other focal point than step 5.

References

External links 
 Camera Manual
 Firmware updates
 Panasonic G80/G85 Review

G85
Cameras introduced in 2016